The 2010 Rally America season is the sixth season of Rally America. The season consists of 6 rallies and began on January 29, with the Sno* Drift National Rally in Michigan. They will also be hosting 3 rally-cross competitions in the fall at New Jersey Motor Sports Park. The Rally in the 100 Acre Wood had Ken Block in a Ford Fiesta was the first time in 10 years that Ford has been on the podium. It also marked the first time since 2004 that a Subaru was not on the podium, and the first time in history that a Subaru has not won the championship.

Antoine L'Estage won the Open championship, winning the rallies in Susquehannock and New England to give him an eventual 27-point winning margin over William Bacon. In the other classes, Patrick Moro won the Super Production Championship, and Christopher Duplessis won the championship for 2WD cars.

Schedule

Major entries

Open
Only the top 10 competitors are listed, as well as other well-known racers.

Super Production
This is the top 5 of the current competitors.

2 Wheel Drive
This is the top 5 of the current competitors.

References

External links
Rally America
Rally America Videos
Old Rally Results

Rally America seasons
Rally America
2010 in rallying